Colonel Oliver James Bond, South Carolina Militia (May 11, 1865 – October 1, 1933) was an American educator and college administrator who served as both Superintendent and President of The Citadel from 1908-1931.

Born in Marion, South Carolina he entered the South Carolina Military Academy at Charleston in 1882 with the first group of cadets to enroll after the school reopened following its occupation by Union troops at the end of the American Civil War; after graduating in 1886 he was appointed an Assistant Professor of Mathematics and later served as Professor of Mechanical Drawing and Astronomy.  He was elevated to Superintendent in 1908, in 1910 the name of the school was changed to The Citadel, The Military College of South Carolina and in 1921 the Superintendent title was changed to President; Bond was the last Superintendent and first President of the school.  Also during his tenure enrollment more than doubled and in 1922 the school moved from its original location on Marion Square in downtown Charleston to “The Greater Citadel”, a new 300 acre campus located between the Ashley River and Hampton Park on the northwest side of the city.

After retiring as president he was appointed Academic Dean; during this time he wrote the first detailed history of the school entitled The Story of The Citadel.  Bond Hall, the administration building on The Citadel campus is named in his honor.  Junior cadets trying out for The Summerall Guards elite drill platoon are known as “Bond Volunteers”.

Bond married Mary Fishburne Roach (1868–1958) of Bamberg, South Carolina in 1889; they had a son Major Oliver J. Bond III U.S. Army (1890–1934). He died from a heart attack in 1933 and is interred at Magnolia Cemetery in Charleston.

References 

1865 births
1933 deaths
Presidents of The Citadel, The Military College of South Carolina
Military personnel from South Carolina
The Citadel, The Military College of South Carolina alumni
The Citadel, The Military College of South Carolina faculty
People from Marion, South Carolina